In experimental and applied particle physics, nuclear physics, and nuclear engineering, a particle detector, also known as a radiation detector, is a device used to detect, track, and/or identify ionizing particles, such as those produced by nuclear decay, cosmic radiation, or reactions in a particle accelerator. Detectors can measure the particle energy and other attributes such as momentum, spin, charge, particle type, in addition to merely registering the presence of the particle.

Examples and types

Many of the detectors invented and used so far are ionization detectors (of which gaseous ionization detectors and semiconductor detectors are most typical) and scintillation detectors; but other, completely different principles have also been applied, like Čerenkov light and transition radiation.

Historical examples
Bubble chamber
Wilson cloud chamber (diffusion chamber)
Photographic plate

Detectors for radiation protection

The following types of particle detector are widely used for radiation protection, and are commercially produced in large quantities for general use within the nuclear, medical, and environmental fields.
Dosimeter
Electroscope (when used as a portable dosimeter)
Gaseous ionization detector
Geiger counter
Ionization chamber
Proportional counter
Scintillation counter
Semiconductor detector

Commonly used detectors for particle and nuclear physics

Gaseous ionization detector
Ionization chamber
Proportional counter
Multiwire proportional chamber
Drift chamber
Time projection chamber
Micropattern gaseous detector
Geiger–Müller tube
Spark chamber
Solid-state detectors:
Semiconductor detector and variants including CCDs
Silicon Vertex Detector
Solid-state nuclear track detector
Cherenkov detector
Ring-imaging Cherenkov detector (RICH)
Scintillation counter and associated photomultiplier, photodiode, or avalanche photodiode
Lucas cell
Time-of-flight detector
Transition radiation detector
Calorimeter
Microchannel plate detector
Neutron detector

Modern detectors

Modern detectors in particle physics combine several of the above elements in layers much like an onion.

Research particle detectors
Detectors designed for modern accelerators are huge, both in size and in cost. The term counter is often used instead of detector when the detector counts the particles but does not resolve its energy or ionization. Particle detectors can also usually track ionizing radiation (high energy photons or even visible light). If their main purpose is radiation measurement, they are called radiation detectors, but as photons are also (massless) particles, the term particle detector is still correct.

At colliders
At CERN
for the LHC
CMS
ATLAS
ALICE
LHCb
for the LEP
Aleph
Delphi
L3
Opal
for the SPS
The COMPASS Experiment
Gargamelle
NA61/SHINE
At Fermilab
for the Tevatron
CDF
D0
Mu2e
At DESY
for HERA
H1
HERA-B
HERMES
ZEUS
At BNL
for the RHIC
PHENIX
Phobos
STAR
At SLAC
for the PeP-II
BaBar
for the SLC
SLD
At Cornell
for CESR
CLEO
CUSB
At BINP
for the VEPP-2M and VEPP-2000
ND
SND
CMD
for the VEPP-4
KEDR
Others
MECO from UC Irvine

Under construction
For International Linear Collider (ILC)
CALICE (Calorimeter for Linear Collider Experiment)

Without colliders
Antarctic Muon And Neutrino Detector Array (AMANDA)
Cryogenic Dark Matter Search (CDMS)
Super-Kamiokande
XENON

On spacecraft
Alpha Magnetic Spectrometer (AMS)
JEDI (Jupiter Energetic-particle Detector Instrument)

Theoretical Models of Particle Detectors 
Beyond their experimental implementations, theoretical models of particle detectors are also of great importance to theoretical physics. These models consider localized non-relativistic quantum systems coupled to a quantum field. They receive the name of particle detectors because when the non-relativistic quantum system is measured in an excited state, one can claim to have detected a particle.  The first instance of particle detector models in the literature dates from the 80's, where a particle in a box was introduced by W. G. Unruh in order to probe a quantum field around a black hole. Shortly after, Bryce DeWitt proposed a simplification of the model, giving rise to the Unruh-DeWitt detector model.

Beyond their applications to theoretical physics, particle detector models are related to experimental fields such as quantum optics, where atoms can be used as detectors for the quantum electromagnetic field via the light-matter interaction. From a conceptual side, particle detectors also allow one to formally define the concept of particles without relying on asymptotic states, or representations of a quantum field theory. As M. Scully puts it, from an operational viewpoint one can state that "a particle is what a particle detector detects", which in essence defines a particle as the detection of excitations of a quantum field.

See also
Counting efficiency
List of particles
Tail-pulse generator

References

Further reading
Filmstrips
"Radiation detectors". H. M. Stone Productions, Schloat. Tarrytown, N.Y., Prentice-Hall Media, 1972.

General Information

 
Ionising radiation detectors